Idaea subsaturata is a moth of the family Geometridae. It is found in the coastal regions of the Iberian Peninsula (from southern Portugal to the eastern Pyrenees), northern Spain and in small populations near Madrid and in northern Portugal. It is also found in isolated populations in France (Depts. Vendée, Deux-Sèvres, Lot, Aveyron, Lozère, Gard, Herault, Aude, Pyrenées Orientales and Var). It is also found in North Africa, from North-eastern Morocco and northern Algeria up to Tunisia and western Libya.

The wingspan is 14–15 mm. The moth flies in up to three generations. In low areas it flies from May to October, in mountainous areas from July to August.

The larvae feed on various herbaceous plants, including Taraxacum officinale, Lactuca sativa, Polygonum aviculare.

External links
 Fauna Europaea
 Moths and Butterflies of Europe and North Africa
 Insectarium virtual
 Les Carnets du Lépidoptériste Français 
 mnhn.fr
 Lot Moths and Butterflies 

Sterrhini
Moths of Europe
Moths of Africa
Moths described in 1858
Taxa named by Achille Guenée